Lindsay McKenzie (born 28 June 1985) is a Scottish actress who starred in BBC One children's show, Raven: The Island, playing the part of Princess Erina. She attended Kilmarnock Academy and then went to study acting at Liverpool Institute for Performing Arts (LIPA).

Princess Erina

Lindsay McKenzie's most notable role to date is the role of Princess Erina in CBBC's Raven: The Island. In this programme, she plays a princess who has lost her island, Alaunus, to demonic forces and is now determined to win it back. Forced into hiding while her good friend Raven is in exile, Erina hides far from the demons' eyes in the most secluded parts of the island, accompanied by her sprite friend, Haryad.

McKenzie's co-stars, James Mackenzie (Raven) and Michael MacKenzie (Cyrus) are not related to her.

Filmography

Television
 Raven: The Island (2006)

External links

1985 births
Living people
People educated at Kilmarnock Academy
Scottish television actresses
People from Kilmarnock
Alumni of the Liverpool Institute for Performing Arts